Malavatuan or Malabatuan is a small island in the Philippines and part of the Lubang group of islands. In 1919 it was denoted as being covered in brushwood (branches and twigs fallen from trees and shrubs).

See also

 List of islands of the Philippines

References

Islands of Occidental Mindoro